Bond Swamp National Wildlife Refuge, located  south of Macon, Georgia, United States, was established in 1989 to protect, maintain and enhance the forested wetland ecosystem of the Ocmulgee River floodplain. It opened to the public in 2000 and currently consists of  situated along the fall line separating the Piedmont and Coastal Plains. The refuge has a diversity of vegetation communities, including mixed hardwood-pine, bottomland hardwoods, tupelo gum swamp forests, creeks, tributaries, beaver swamps and oxbow lakes. The refuge is rich in wildlife diversity including white-tailed deer, wood ducks, black bears, alligators, wild turkey, a nesting pair of bald eagles and excellent wintering habitat for waterfowl. Extensive bottomland hardwoods provide critical habitat for neotropical songbirds of concern, such as Swainson's warbler, wood thrush, prothonotary warbler and yellow-billed cuckoo. The combination of warm weather and wet areas at Bond Swamp provide ideal conditions for a variety of reptile and amphibian species.

References
Profile of Bond Swamp National Wildlife Refuge
Refuge website

Protected areas of Bibb County, Georgia
National Wildlife Refuges in Georgia (U.S. state)
Protected areas established in 1989
Protected areas of Twiggs County, Georgia
Wetlands of Georgia (U.S. state)
Landforms of Bibb County, Georgia
Landforms of Twiggs County, Georgia